The Red Line (Line 1) is a metro rail line of the Delhi Metro, a rapid transit system in Delhi, India. It is an entirely elevated line and has 29 stations that runs from Rithala to Shaheed Sthal with a total distance of 34.55 km. The Tis Hazari – Shahdara section of this line was the first stretch of the Delhi Metro that was constructed and commissioned. The line connects the areas of Ghaziabad in Uttar Pradesh and the districts of  Shahdara, Central Delhi and North West Delhi in Delhi.

The Red Line has interchanges with the Yellow Line and Violet line at Kashmere Gate, the Pink Line at Welcome and Netaji Subhash Place, and the Green Line at Inderlok. It is the third most heavily used line of the Delhi Metro network as it acts as a link for those who reside in West Delhi and North West Delhi and travel towards Central Delhi, Shahdara and East Delhi and vice versa.

History

The Red Line was the first line of the Delhi Metro to be constructed and opened. The Tis Hazari – Shahdara section of the line was inaugurated by the then Prime Minister of India, Shri. Atal Bihari Vajpayee, on 25 December 2002 and opened to the public on the same day. Subsequent sections opened between Tis Hazari – Inderlok on 3 October 2003, Inderlok – Rithala on 31 March 2004 and Shahdara – Dilshad Garden on 4 June 2008.

As part of the Phase III of Delhi Metro, an eastward extension of 9.5 km from Dilshad Garden to Ghaziabad ISBT (New Bus Adda) was approved by DMRC and MoHUA in January 2014. Construction began in early 2015 and commercial operations started on 8 March 2019, thereby providing commuters another link to travel to Ghaziabad along with the Blue Line branch that connects to Kaushambi and Vaishali. In November 2022, Delhi Metro introduced a set of two eight-coach trains on its Red Line, which were converted from the existing fleet of 39 six-coach trains.

Phase IV 
Under the Phase IV of the Delhi Metro, the Red Line will be extended towards Narela (21.73 km) with 19 proposed stations at Rohini Sector 25, Rohini Sector 26, Rohini Sector 31, Rohini Sector 32, Rohini Sector 36, Rohini Sector 37, Barwala, Pooth Khurd, Bawana Industrial Area – 1, Bawana Industrial Area – 2, Bawana, Bawana JJ Colony, Sanoth, New Sanoth Colony, Sanoth Depot Station, Bhorgarh Village, Anaj Mandi Narela, DDA Sports Complex Narela and Narela.

List of stations

Delhi Metro currently has parking facilities  at 20 metro stations of the Red line.
 
{| class="wikitable"  style="text-align:center; width:100%;"
|- 
! style="background:#;" colspan="10" | Red Line
|-
! rowspan="2" |No.
! colspan="2" |Station Name
! rowspan="2" |Phase
! rowspan="2" |Opening
! rowspan="2" |Interchange connection
! rowspan="2" |Station Layout
! rowspan="2" |Platform Level Type
! rowspan="2" |Depot Connection
! rowspan="2" |Depot Layout
|-
! English
! Hindi
|-
| 1||||शहीद स्थल
|3||8 March 2019 ||Delhi-Meerut RRTS
|Elevated
|Side
|None
|None
|-
| 2||||हिंडन रिवर
|3||8 March 2019 ||
|Elevated
|Side
|None
|None
|-
| 3||
|अर्थला
|3||8 March 2019 || ||Elevated
|Side
|None
|None 
|-
| 4||||मोहन नगर
|3||8 March 2019 || ||Elevated
|Side
|None
|None
|-
| 5||||श्याम पार्क
|3||8 March 2019 ||
|Elevated
|Side
|None
|None
|-
| 6||||मे‌‌जर मोहित शर्मा राजेन्द्र नगर
|3||8 March 2019 ||
|Elevated
|Side
|None
|None
|-
| 7||||राज बाग़
|3|| 8 March 2019 || ||Elevated
|Side
|None
|None
|-
| 8||||शहीद नगर
|3||8 March 2019 ||
|Elevated
|Side
|None
|None
|-
| 9||||दिलशाद गार्डन
|2||4 June 2008||
||Elevated
|Side
|None
|None
|-
| 10|| ||झिलमिल कॉलोनी
|2||4 June 2008||
|Elevated
|Side
|None
|None
|-
|11|| ||मानसरोवर पार्क
|2||4 June 2008||
|Elevated
|Side
|None
|None
|-
|12|| ||शाहदरा
|1||25 December 2002||Shahdara railway station
|At Grade
|Side
|None
|None
|-
|13|| ||वेलकम
|1||25 December 2002||
|At Grade
|Island
|None
|None
|-
|14|| ||सीलमपुर
|1||25 December 2002||
|At Grade
|Island
|None
|None
|-
|15|| ||शास्त्री पार्क
|1||25 December 2002||
|At Grade
|Side
|Shastri Park Depot
|At Grade
|-
|16|| ||कश्मीरी गेट
|1||25 December 2002||  Kashmere Gate ISBT
|Elevated
|Side
|None
|None
|-
|17|| ||तीस हज़ारी
|1||25 December 2002|| Sadar Bazar railway station
|Elevated
|Side
|None
|None
|-
|18||||पुल बंगश
|1
| 3 2003 October |3 October 2003
| (Phase 4 - Under Construction)
|Elevated
|Side
|None
|None
|-
|19|| ||प्रताप नगर
|1||3 October 2003||Subzi Mandi railway station
|Elevated
|Side
|None
|None
|-
|20|| ||शास्त्री नगर
|1||3 October 2003|| Sarai Rohilla railway station
|Elevated
|Side
|None
|None
|-
|21|| ||इन्दरलोक
|1||3 October 2003||
|Elevated
|Side
|None
|None
|-
|22|| ||कन्हैया नगर
|2||31 March 2004||
|Elevated
|Side
|None
|None
|-
|23|| ||केशव पुरम
|2||31 March 2004||
|Elevated
|Side
|None
|None
|-
|24|| ||नेताजी सुभाष प्लेस
|2||31 March 2004||
|Elevated
|Side
|None
|None
|-
|25|| ||कोहाट एन्क्लेव
|2||31 March 2004||
|Elevated
|Side
|None
|None
|-
|26|| ||पीतमपुरा
|2||31 March 2004|| (Phase 4 - Under Construction)
|Elevated
|Side
|None
|None
|-
|27|| ||रोहिणी पूर्व
|2||31 March 2004|| ||Elevated
|Side
|None
|None
|-
|28||||रोहिणी पश्चिम
|2||31 March 2004||
|Elevated
|Side
|None
|None
|-
|29|| ||रिठाला
|2||31 March 2004||
|Elevated
|Side
|None
|None
|}

Train Info

See also

References

External links

 Delhi Metro Rail Corporation Ltd. (Official site) 
 Delhi Metro Annual Reports
 
 UrbanRail.Net – descriptions of all metro systems in the world, each with a schematic map showing all stations.

Railway lines opened in 2002
Delhi Metro lines
2002 establishments in Delhi